Muthuraman  is a surname. Notable people with the surname include:

 B. Muthuraman (born 1944), business manager
 Karthik Muthuraman (born 1960), Indian actor, singer, and politician
 R. Muthuraman (1929–1982), Tamil actor
 S. P. Muthuraman (born 1935), Indian director

Indian surnames